This is a list of films which have placed number one at the weekend box office in Japan during 2006.

References
 Note: Click on the relevant weekend to view specifics.

2006
Japan
2006 in Japanese cinema